Sofia was the name of two versions of two-passenger vehicles manufactured in Bulgaria in the 1980s and 1990s, from designer Velizar Andreev.

History 
Velizar Andreev attended MEI (Institute for Machinery and Electrical Engineering) in Sofia, graduating in 1962 with an engineering degree in design of vehicles (automobiles, tractors and lift cars).  During his studies, he built a fully functioning prototype automobile with modern lines (which unfortunately has not survived); his graduate project was a mockup of a passenger car.  When the graduate project was demonstrated to the grading committee, its non-conservative styling did not sit well, and they gave only a passable grade to the avant-garde design with hidden headlamps.

In 1979 Andreev established the Sofia Club, which served as a meeting ground where ideas regarding the design and manufacture of a Bulgarian-made sports car could be freely discussed. About the same time, Andreev collaborated with several auto mechanics students and engineers to build his first prototype sports car. The finished prototype was displayed to the public in October 1981 at the Plovdiv Fair. The attractive prototype was made of fiberglass and was entirely designed by Andreev, both mechanically and visually. The engine and some mechanical components were borrowed from the VAZ 2101 "Zhiguli", but as a whole, the prototype was similar to the future Sofia production car. The major differences between the prototype and the production car were the prototype's shorter wheelbase, lack of roof or doors (a roll bar mounted above the two passengers' heads was supposed to protect them in accidents), and larger tires.

In fall 1985 the Plovdiv Fair showcased the prototype of the sports car Sofia, which Andreev and several collaborators had made in 1984.  It was painted dark-red metallic color.

Production 
In 1986 a small industrial cooperative called Avantgarde was formed to begin the production of the sports car Sofia B, whose annual production volume was initially planned at 200 cars.

In 1989 the Plovdiv Fair again showcased the final version of the Sofia B, painted in gray metallic color; the manufacture of the car was supported by the machine-building firm Balkankar and the Bulgarian Ministry of Machine-Building. The car's headlights were no longer of the flip-up type, instead becoming exposed and mounted on the front of the hood; the car's rear was also radically restyled. The gull-wing doors were abandoned as well, which did not detract from the design and made the car easier to produce and live with. The interior also received numerous improvements.

In 1990, after a three-month-long effort, Andreev completed the prototype of a light SUV named Sofia C, with an engine borrowed from a Lada passenger car. That same year also saw the start of serial production of both the Sofia B and the Sofia C, made by Andreev's own private company Vilicar.

During the 1990s, Andreev broadened the scope of his automotive-related activities by continuing to produce his own cars, and by tuning private passenger cars and converting passenger cars into commercial delivery vehicles. In 1997 Andreev also produced a prototype of a small passenger bus which was exhibited at the Plovdiv Fair.  It was based on an Avia chassis.

End 
Until his death in 2001, Velizar Andreev successfully defended and advanced an idea that seemed ludicrous to many others - the design and serial production of Bulgarian sports cars. His automotive workshop became the first and, until now, the only applied school for young Bulgarian car designers.  After his death his son, Bozidar Andreev, became president of a company which continues providing parts and conversions for vehicles, including Sofias.

Production numbers 
Sofia-B (1985–2001): 12
Sofia-C (1990–2001): 60

References 

Sports car manufacturers
Defunct motor vehicle manufacturers of Bulgaria
Car manufacturers of Bulgaria
Cars of Bulgaria